The 1979 Berlin Marathon was the 6th running of the annual marathon race held in Berlin, West Germany, held on 30 September. West Germany's Ingo Sensburg won the men's race in 2:21:09 hours, while the women's race was won by West Germany's Jutta von Haase in 3:07:07. A total of 222 runners finished the race, comprising 207 men and 15 women.

Results

Men

Women

References 

 Results. Association of Road Racing Statisticians. Retrieved 2020-06-24.
 Berlin Marathon results archive. Berlin Marathon. Retrieved 2020-06-24.

External links 
 Official website

1979
Berlin Marathon
1970s in West Berlin
Berlin Marathon
Berlin Marathon